Tiburcio, the Spanish form of Tiburtius, may refer to:

Tiburcio Carías Andino (1876–1969), Honduran military strongman
Tiburcio de León, Filipino general (the Philippine Revolution and Philippine-American War)
José Tiburcio Serrizuela (born 1962), Argentine football (soccer) defender
Tibúrcio Spannocchi (1541–1609), Spanish military engineer
Tiburcio Vásquez (1835–1875), bandit in California

See also
4349 Tibúrcio, asteroid
Estadio Tiburcio Carías Andino, stadium in Honduras

Spanish masculine given names